Dave Digs Disney is a 1957 studio album by the Dave Brubeck Quartet. It features jazz renditions of songs from the animated Disney films Alice in Wonderland, Pinocchio and Snow White and the Seven Dwarfs. It is one of Brubeck's most popular albums. The album was reissued in 2011, with remastered recordings and two bonus tracks: "Very Good Advice" (from Alice in Wonderland) and "So This Is Love" (from Cinderella).

The original LP was issued only in mono, though stereo tapes were recorded at the time. The stereo mixes of the album's tracks were not widely available until later re-releases.

Production
The Disney tunes played on this album were played by the quartet for some time, but it took a family trip to Disneyland to convince Brubeck to call up his producer and pitch his idea of a Disney album.

At the time, Disney songs were considered below the talents of jazz musicians, yet Brubeck took a financial risk on the album and it paid off. Later, other jazz artists would record Disney songs as well. "Someday My Prince Will Come" most notably became a jazz standard, and was later recorded by Miles Davis and John Coltrane, among others.

Track listing
All tracks written by Frank Churchill and Larry Morey except where noted.

 "Alice in Wonderland" (Sammy Fain, Bob Hilliard)  – 9:24   
 "Give A Little Whistle" (Leigh Harline, Ned Washington) – 7:32  
 "Heigh-Ho (The Dwarfs' Marching Song)" – 3:53
 "When You Wish Upon A Star" (Leigh Harline, Ned Washington) – 4:49
 "Some Day My Prince Will Come" – 8:15
 "One Song" – 4:56   
Reissue Bonus Tracks
  "Very Good Advice" (Sammy Fain, Bob Hilliard) – 5:31 
 "So This Is Love" (Mack David, Al Hoffman, Jerry Livingston) – 5:56

Personnel
Dave Brubeck - piano
Paul Desmond - alto saxophone
Joe Morello - drums
Norman Bates - bass

References

External links
Official website

1957 albums
Albums produced by George Avakian
Columbia Records albums
Dave Brubeck albums
Disney music